Jalan Malim Nawar (Perak state route A114) is a major road in Perak, Malaysia.

List of junctions

Malim Nawar